Ivelin Iliev (born 8 August 1997) is a Bulgarian footballer who currently plays as a winger for Bulgarian Third League club Rozova Dolina.

Career
Iliev started his youth career at the local club Rozova Dolina. Later he moved to Beroe Stara Zagora's academy. In 2014, he moved to Vereya, playing with the team in the B Group. In the beginning of 2016 he returned to Beroe, making his debut in the A Group on 30 April 2016 in a match against Slavia Sofia.

In July 2017, Iliev signed with Botev Vratsa but was released a few weeks later and subsequently joined his hometown club Rozova Dolina.

On 1 July 2018, Iliev joined Kariana.

Career statistics

Club

References

External links
 

Living people
1997 births
People from Kazanlak
Bulgarian footballers
Association football wingers
FC Vereya players
PFC Beroe Stara Zagora players
FC Botev Galabovo players
FC Kariana Erden players
FC Montana players
First Professional Football League (Bulgaria) players
Second Professional Football League (Bulgaria) players